Conditioners used on leather take many shapes and forms.  They are used mostly to keep leather from drying out and deteriorating.

A very old and widely used conditioner is dubbin. Another common conditioner is Mink oil.

See also 
Saddle soap

Leathermaking